Chhera Island, also called Chhera Dwip, Cheradia Island or Cheridia Island, is an uninhabited island and extension of St. Martin's Island at the mouth of the Naf River in the Bay of Bengal, within the Chittagong Division of southeastern Bangladesh. Chhera Island is the southernmost island of Bangladesh

Description
During high tides it is divided from St. Martin's Island by the sea.  During low tides, the island can be reached by walking for about 2½ hours from St. Martin's Island.

The most popular travel mode to it is by local motorboat or tourist boat services.

Washed up corals can be found on the island's beaches. It has an area of shrub and palm tree vegetation. No permanent settlement is established on the island.

See also

 
 List of islands of Bangladesh

References

External links

Islands of the Bay of Bengal
Uninhabited islands of Bangladesh
Chittagong Division
Cox's Bazar District
Islands of Bangladesh